The Glendale Desert Dogs are a baseball team that plays in the West Division of the Arizona Fall League. They play their home games at Camelback Ranch in Glendale, Arizona. The ballpark is also the spring training facility of the Chicago White Sox and Los Angeles Dodgers. The team was established in 1992 as the Chandler Diamondbacks, and played for three seasons under that name. The team's nickname has been Desert Dogs since 1995, persisting through several location changes. The Desert Dogs have won six league championships, most recently in 2008. Their five consecutive championships from 2004 to 2008 are an Arizona Fall League record.

The team discontinued use of its original nickname prior to the 1995 season, coincident with a move from Chandler to Phoenix. Earlier that year, Major League Baseball had awarded an expansion franchise to the Phoenix area, which began play in 1998 as the Arizona Diamondbacks.

Roster

See also
 Arizona Fall League#Results by season

References

External links

Arizona Fall League teams
1992 establishments in Arizona
Baseball teams established in 1992
Professional baseball teams in Arizona
Sports in Glendale, Arizona